DXAS (104.7 FM) Radyo Pilipinas  is a radio station owned and operated by Philippine Broadcasting Service. The station's studio is located in Brgy. Bongao Poblacion, Bongao, Tawi-Tawi.

References

Philippine Broadcasting Service
Radio stations in Tawi-Tawi
Radio stations established in 2016